The inspector general of the Department of State heads the Office of the Inspector General of the Department of State and is responsible for detecting and investigating waste, fraud, abuse, and mismanagement in the United States Department of State. In the department, the inspector general has a rank equivalent to assistant secretary.

List of inspectors general of the Department of State

Obama and Trump administrations
Harold W. Geisel served as acting inspector general during Hillary Clinton's service as Secretary of State., which lasted until February 1, 2013. There was no permanent inspector general at the State Department while Clinton was Secretary, nor did President Barack Obama nominate anyone for that position. Later in 2013, Obama nominated Steve A. Linick, and the Senate confirmed Linick to the role. 

Linick served as inspector general for the balance of Obama's term, continuing into the presidency of Donald Trump. On Friday, May 15, 2020 at 10 p.m., the White House announced that Linick had been removed. The White House said Trump had dismissed Linick at the request of Secretary of State Mike Pompeo. Linick had been conducting several investigations into actions by Pompeo. Trump appointed Stephen Akard, who was concurrently serving as the director of the State Department's Office of Foreign Missions, as acting inspector general. Akard served as acting inspector general less than three months before resigning. Deputy Inspector General Diana Shaw then became acting inspector general.

References

External links
State Department Historian on the Inspector General of the Department of State
Inspector General's Website

United States Department of State agencies
 
State Department